The 2003 British Academy Television Awards were held on Sunday 13 April at The Dorchester in London. The ceremony was hosted by television presenter Anne Robinson.

Winners
Best Actor
Winner: Albert Finney — The Gathering Storm (BBC Two)
Other nominees: Kenneth Branagh — Conspiracy (BBC Two); Kenneth Branagh — Shackleton (Channel 4); James Nesbitt — Bloody Sunday (ITV)
Best Actress
Winner: Julie Walters — Murder (BBC Two)
Other nominees: Sheila Hancock — Bedtime (BBC One); Vanessa Redgrave — The Gathering Storm (BBC Two); Jessica Stevenson — Tomorrow La Scala! (BBC Two)
Best Comedy (Programme or Series)
Winner: Alistair McGowan's Big Impression (Vera / BBC One)
Other nominees: Bremner, Bird and Fortune (Vera / Channel 4); Look Around You (TalkBack Productions / BBC Two); Smack the Pony (Talkback Productions / Channel 4)
Best Comedy Performance
Winner: Ricky Gervais — The Office (BBC Two)
Other nominees: John Bird & John Fortune — Bremner, Bird and Fortune (Channel 4); Steve Coogan — I'm Alan Partridge (BBC Two); Peter Kay — Phoenix Nights (Channel 4)
Best Drama Serial
Winner: Shackleton (Firstsight Films / Channel 4)
Other nominees: Auf Wiedersehen, Pet (BBC / Ziji Productions / BBC One); Doctor Zhivago (Granada Television / ITV); Murder (Tiger Aspect Productions / BBC Two)
Best Drama Series
Winner: Spooks (Kudos Film & Television / BBC One)
Other nominees: Clocking Off (Red Production Company / BBC One); Cutting It (BBC / BBC One); Teachers (Tiger Aspect Productions / Channel 4)
Best Single Drama
Winner: Conspiracy (HBO / BBC Films / BBC Two)
Other nominees: Bloody Sunday (Granada Film / Hell's Kitchen / ITV); Flesh and Blood (Red Production Company / BBC Two); Tomorrow La Scala! (BBC Films / UK Film Council / BBC Two)
Best Soap Opera
Winner: Coronation Street (Granada Television / ITV)
Other nominees: Doctors (BBC / BBC One); EastEnders (BBC / BBC One); Hollyoaks (Mersey Television / Channel 4)
Best Current Affairs
Winner: Young, Nazi and Proud (Steve Boulton Productions / Channel 4)
Other nominees: Panorama — Corruption of Racing (BBC / BBC One); Panorama – Licence to Murder (BBC / BBC One); Palestine is Still the Issue – A Special Report by John Pilger (Carlton Television / ITV)
Best Entertainment Performance
Winner: Paul Merton — Have I Got News For You (BBC One)
Other nominees: Sanjeev Bhaskar — The Kumars at No. 42 (BBC Two); Angus Deayton — Have I Got News For You (BBC One); Meera Syal — The Kumars at No. 42 (BBC Two)
Best Factual Series or Strand
Winner: The Trust (Hart Ryan Productions / Channel 4)
Other nominees: A History of Britain by Simon Schama (BBC / BBC Two); The Life of Mammals (BBC Natural History / BBC One); Revealed (Various / Five)
Best Feature
Winner: Faking It (RDF Media / Channel 4)
Other nominees: Jamie's Kitchen (Talkback Productions / Fresh One / Channel 4); Lads Army (20/20 Television / ITV); What Not to Wear (BBC / BBC Two)
Flaherty Award for Single Documentary
Winner: Feltham Sings (Century Films / Channel 4)
Other nominees: 9/11: The Tale of Two Towers (Michael Attwell Productions / Five); SAS Embassy Siege (BBC / BBC Two); Thalidomide - Life at 40 (BBC Scotland / BBC Two)
Entertainment Programme or Series
Winner: I'm a Celebrity, Get Me Out of Here! (London Weekend Television / ITV)
Other nominees: Friday Night with Jonathan Ross (Open Mike with Mike Bullard / BBC One); The Kumars at No. 42 (Hat Trick Productions / BBC Two); Test the Nation (Talent Television / BBC One)
News Coverage
Winner: Soham - August 16/17 (Sky News / Sky News)
Other nominees: Collapse of the Paul Burrell Trial (BBC / BBC One / BBC News 24); The Death of the Queen Mother (ITN / ITV); Jenin and Bethlehem - What Chance of Peace? (ITN / Channel 4)
Situation Comedy Award
Winner: The Office (BBC / BBC Two)
Other nominees: The Book Group (Pirate Productions / Channel 4); My Family (DLT Entertainment / Rude Boy Productions / BBC One); Phoenix Nights (Ovation Entertainment / Channel 4)
Sport
Winner: The Commonwealth Games (BBC / BBC One)
Other nominees: 2002 FIFA World Cup (ISN / Carlton Television / ITV); World Rally Championship (Chrysalis Television / Channel 4); World Cup: England v Argentina (BBC / BBC One)
The Alan Clarke Award
Norma Percy
Brian Lapping
Special Award
Carl Davis

References
Archive of winners on official BAFTA website (Retrieved 26 January 2006).
British Academy Television Awards 2003  at the Internet Movie Database.

2003 awards in the United Kingdom
Television2003
2003 television awards
2003 in British television
April 2003 events in the United Kingdom